Forever Yours (translit. Hubb lel-abad) is a 1959 Egyptian drama film directed by Youssef Chahine. It was entered into the 1st Moscow International Film Festival.

Cast
 Mahmoud el-Meliguy
 Nadia Lutfi
 Ahmed Ramzy

References

External links
 

1959 films
1959 drama films
1950s Arabic-language films
Films directed by Youssef Chahine
Egyptian drama films
Egyptian black-and-white films